The large New Guinea spiny rat (Rattus praetor) is a species of rodent in the family Muridae.
It is found in Indonesia, Papua New Guinea, and the Solomon Islands.

References

Rattus
Mammals described in 1888
Taxa named by Oldfield Thomas
Taxonomy articles created by Polbot
Rodents of New Guinea